Ryan Lucas (born October 23, 1984 in Vancouver, British Columbia) is a former professional Canadian football defensive tackle who last played for the Winnipeg Blue Bombers of the Canadian Football League. He was originally signed by the Montreal Alouettes as a free agent on December 25, 2006, and spent the majority of the 2007 and 2008 seasons on the practice roster. Lucas signed with the Saskatchewan Roughriders on June 1, 2010 as a free agent. He was claimed by the Montreal Alouettes off the Riders' practice roster on July 31, 2011 and released in the following off-season on March 26, 2012. He played college football for the Western Washington Vikings. On January 8, 2015 Lucas announced his retirement from professional football.

References

External links
Winnipeg Blue Bombers bio

1984 births
Living people
Canadian football defensive linemen
Montreal Alouettes players
Players of Canadian football from British Columbia
Saskatchewan Roughriders players
Canadian football people from Vancouver
Western Washington Vikings football players
Winnipeg Blue Bombers players